Bulbella is a genus of bryozoa belonging to the family Victorellidae.

Species:

Bulbella abscondita

References

Bryozoan genera